The 2020–21 HKFA Sapling Cup is the 6th edition of the Sapling Cup, and is the third time in history without name sponsorship. The competition is contested by the 8 teams in the 2020–21 Hong Kong Premier League. Each team is required to field a minimum of three players born on or after 1 January 1999 (U-22) and a maximum of six foreign players during every whole match, with no more than four foreign players on the pitch at the same time. 

Kitchee are the defending champions, but were eliminated in the semi-finals. Eastern became the champions for the first time after beating Happy Valley in the final.

Calendar

Group stage

Group A

Group B

Semi-finals
The semi-final took place on 24 February 2021 at Mong Kok Stadium.

Final
The final took place on 7 April 2021 at Mong Kok Stadium.

Top scorers

Remarks

References

2020–21 domestic association football cups
Sapling Cup
Hong Kong Sapling Cup